Mount Tregear, is a 2042 m mountain in New Zealand's South Island.

Mount Tregear is on the main divide at the head of the Mathias River of New Zealand's Southern Alps. It is located 38 kilometres southwest of Arthurs Pass. It is named after Edward Robert Tregear.

References

 (2010):  Topo50 map BV19 - Lake Kaniere

Southern Alps
Mountains of Canterbury, New Zealand